Monica Collingwood (1908–1989) was an American film editor who was nominated for the Academy Award for Best Film Editing at the 1947 Academy Awards for the Henry Koster drama The Bishop's Wife (1947).

Biography 
Monica was born in Jackson, Missouri, to Joseph Collingwood (a British immigrant) and Elizabeth Emery (a native of Luxembourg). When the family moved west to California, her father worked as a policeman at one of the big film studios. She married Willard Nico, a Russia-born fellow film editor, in 1927; the pair had a son, Willard Jr.

Selected filmography

The Secret Life of Walter Mitty (1947)
The Bishop's Wife (1947)
Fangs of the Wild (1954)
Lassie's Great Adventure (1963)

References

External links

1908 births
1989 deaths
People from Jackson, Missouri
American film editors
American women film editors